Baobab may refer to:
Baobab tree
Baobab College
Disk Usage Analyzer - previously called "Baobab"
Orchestra Baobab (band)
Production Baobab
The Golden Baobab Prize